The Sherbrooke City Council (in French: Conseil municipal de Sherbrooke) is the governing body for the mayor–council government in the city of Sherbrooke, in the Estrie region of Quebec. The council consists of a mayor and 14 councillors. 

The councillors each sit both on the main city council and on separate borough councils, which serve a similar function for business that the city delegates to its boroughs instead of to the primary government. The city's smallest borough, Lennoxville, elects only a single representative to the main city council, and elects two representatives who serve only as borough councillors and do not sit on the main citywide body. In the three larger boroughs, however, only the borough's regular city councillors sit on the borough council.

Mayor
Évelyne Beaudin

Councillors
Elected in the 2021 municipal elections

* Borough presidents

See also
List of mayors of Sherbrooke

External links
Sherbrooke City Council 

Municipal councils in Quebec
Politics of Sherbrooke